Domestication syndrome refers to two sets of phenotypic traits that are common to either domesticated animals, or domesticated plants. These traits were identified by Charles Darwin in The Variation of Animals and Plants Under Domestication.

Domesticated animals tend to be smaller and less aggressive than their wild counterparts, they may also have floppy ears, variations to coat color, a smaller brain, and a shorter muzzle. Other traits may include changes in the endocrine system and an extended breeding cycle.

Research suggests that modified neural crest cells are potentially responsible for the traits that are common across many domesticated animal species.

The process of plant domestication has produced changes in shattering/fruit abscission, shorter height, larger grain or fruit size, easier threshing, synchronous flowering, and increased yield, as well as changes in color, taste, and texture.

Origin

Charles Darwin's study of The Variation of Animals and Plants Under Domestication in 1868 identified behavioral, morphological, and physiological traits that are shared by domestic animals, but not by their wild ancestors. These shared traits became known as the domestication syndrome. These traits include tameness, docility, floppy ears, altered tails, novel coat colors and patterns, reduced brain size, reduced body mass and smaller teeth. Other traits include changes in craniofacial morphology, alterations to the endocrine system, and changes to the female estrous cycles including the ability to breed all year-round.

A recent hypothesis suggests that neural crest cell behaviour may be modified by domestication, which then leads to those traits that are common across many domesticated animal species.

Challenge
The syndrome was reported to have appeared in the domesticated silver fox cultivated by Dmitry Belyayev's breeding experiment. However, in 2015 canine researcher Raymond Coppinger found historical evidence that Belyayev's foxes originated in fox farms on Prince Edward Island and had been bred there for fur farming since the 1800s, and that the traits demonstrated by Belyayev had occurred in the foxes prior to the breeding experiment. These 2015 findings were highlighted by the authors of an opinion paper published in 2019, which argued the results of the "Russian farm fox experiment" had been overstated. However, the pre-domesticated origins of the Russian farmed foxes were already a matter of public record, being previously discussed in a 2011 publication by authors associated with the Russian fox experiment. 

This aside, Lord et al.'s opinion piece questioned the rigour and findings of the Russian fox experiment on the basis that multiple aspects of the domestication syndrome were already present in these founding foxes. They further questioned the entire existence of domestication syndrome in animals, suggesting that other theories need to be considered for these shared traits, including adaptations to a human-modified environment.

In 2020, Wright et al. argued Lord et al.'s work refuted only a narrow and unrealistic definition of domestication syndrome because they assumed it is caused by genetic pleiotropy and arises in response to 'selection for tameness'. In the same year, Zeder compellingly argued it makes no sense to deny the existence of domestication syndrome on the basis that domestication syndrome traits were present in the pre-domesticated founding foxes. In effect, she pointed out that the presence of domestication syndrome cannot be used to disprove the existence of domestication syndrome.

Although the soundness of the domestication syndrome – and the extent to which the Belyaev experiment could be used as evidence to support its existence – has been questioned, the hypothesis that neural crest genes underlie some of the phenotypic differences between domestic and wild horses and dogs is supported by the functional enrichment of candidate genes under selection.

Cause
Many similar traits – both in animals and plants – are produced by orthologs, however whether this is true for domestication traits or merely for wild forms is less clear. Especially in the case of crops, doubt has been cast because some domestication traits have been found to result from unrelated loci. In 2018, a study identified 429 genes that differed between modern dogs and modern wolves. As the differences in these genes could also be found in ancient dog fossils, these were regarded as being the result of the initial domestication and not from recent breed formation. These genes are linked to neural crest and central nervous system development. These genes affect embryogenesis and can confer tameness, smaller jaws, floppy ears, and diminished craniofacial development, which distinguish domesticated dogs from wolves and are considered to reflect domestication syndrome. The study proposes that domestication syndrome is caused by alterations in the migration or activity of neural crest cells during their development. The study concluded that during early dog domestication, the initial selection was for behavior. This trait is influenced by those genes which act in the neural crest, which led to the phenotypes observed in modern dogs.

In animals
A dog's cranium is 15% smaller than an equally heavy wolf's, and the dog is less aggressive and more playful. Other species pairs show similar differences. Bonobos, like chimpanzees, are a close genetic cousin to humans, but unlike the chimpanzees, bonobos are not aggressive and do not participate in lethal inter-group aggression or kill within their own group. The most distinctive features of a bonobo are its cranium, which is 15% smaller than a chimpanzee's, and its less aggressive and more playful behavior. In other examples, the guinea pig's cranium is 13% smaller than its wild cousin the cavy, and domestic fowl show a similar reduction to their wild cousins. Possession of a smaller cranium for holding a smaller brain is a telltale sign of domestication. Bonobos appear to have domesticated themselves. In the farm fox experiment, humans selectively bred foxes against aggression, causing domestication syndrome. The foxes were not selectively bred for smaller craniums and teeth, floppy ears, or skills at using human gestures, but these traits were demonstrated in the friendly foxes. Natural selection favors those that are the most successful at reproducing, not the most aggressive. Selection against aggression made possible the ability to cooperate and communicate among foxes, dogs and bonobos. Perhaps it did the same thing for humans. The more docile animals have been found to have less testosterone than their more aggressive counterparts, and testosterone controls aggression and brain size. One researcher has argued that in becoming more social, we humans have developed a smaller brain than those of humans 20,000 years ago.

In 2017, a researcher proposed that humans show the same domestication syndrome traits that can be found in other domesticated animals, which supports the theory of human self-domestication.

In plants

Syndrome traits
The same concept appears in the plant domestication process which produces crops, but with its own set of syndrome traits: Little to no shattering/fruit abscission, shorter height (thus decreased lodging), larger grain or fruit size, easier threshing, synchronous flowering, altered timing of flowering, increased grain weight, glutinousness (stickiness, not gluten protein content), increased fruit/grain number, altered color compounds, taste, and texture, daylength independence, determinate growth, lesser/no vernalization, less seed dormancy.

Genes by trait
Control of the syndrome traits is by:

Shattering
 qSH1 in rice
 SH1 in sorghum, rice, and maize/corn
 sh4 in the rachis of rice
 qPDH1 in soybean
 Q in wheat
 OsLG1 in rice

Plant height
 Rht-1/Rht-B1b/Rht-D1b/Reduced height-B1/Reduced height-D1 in wheat
 GA20ox-2/OsGA20ox-2 in rice
 OsKO2 in one Japanese cultivar
 GA20ox-2/HvGA20ox-2 and barley
 either dw3 or d2 in sorghum and pearl millet
 Ghd7 in rice
 Q in wheat

Grain size
 GS3 in maize/corn
 GS3 and GS5 in rice
 An-1 in rice
 GAD1/RAE2 (smaller) in rice
 OsGS3 in rice

Yield
 Oryza sativa SPL14/LOC4345998 in rice.
 pyl1, pyl4, pyl6 in the OsPYL gene family in rice

Threshability
 Q and Nud
 An-1 (by reducing or eliminating awns) in rice
 An-2/LABA1 - small awn reduction/barbless awns - in rice
 GAD1/RAE2 - awn elimination in rice
 tga1 - naked kernels in maize

Flowering time
 VRN1 in barley, wheat, ryegrass

Grain weight
 GW2 in rice, wheat, maize/corn
 TaGW2 in rice
 OsGW5 in rice
 OsGLW2 in rice
 TaGASR7 in rice
 GW5 in rice
 TGW6 in rice

Glutinousness
 GBSSI or Waxy in rice (especially glutinous rice), wheat, corn, barley, sorghum, foxtail millet
 SBEIIb in rice

Determinate growth
 TERMINAL FLOWER 1/TFL1 in Arabidopsis thaliana and orthologs
 Specifically, four orthologs in Glycine max and eight in Phaseolus vulgaris

Standability
 PROSTRATE GROWTH/Prog1/PROG1 in rice
 teosinte branched1/tb1 (apical dominance) in maize/corn

Grain/fruit number
 An-1 in rice
 GAD1/RAE2 in rice
 PROG1 (by increasing tiller number) in rice
 OsGn1a in rice
 OsAAP3 (by increasing tiller number) in rice

Panicle size
 OsDEP1 in rice
 TaDEP1 in rice

Spike number
 vrs1 in barley

Fragrance
 BADH2 produces 2-Acetyl-1-pyrroline when defective in rice
 OsBADH2 can be artificially disrupted to produce the same compound

Delayed sprouting
 pyl1, pyl4, pyl6 in the OsPYL gene family - reduced preharvest sprouting in rice

Altered color

Reduced color
 Rc - white pericarp in rice

Unspecified trait
 Teosinte glume architecture/tga in maize/corn

Many of these are mutations in regulatory genes, especially transcription factors, which is likely why they work so well in domestication: They are not new, and are relatively ready to have their magnitudes altered. In annual grains, loss of function and altered expression are by far the most common, and thus are the most interesting goals of mutation breeding, while copy number variation and chromosomal rearrangements are far less common.

See also
 Agricultural weed syndrome

References

Domestication
Genetics
Agriculture